A Pack of Liars is a children fiction novel by Anne Fine. It was first published by Hamish Hamilton in 1988. It won the Dillons/Puffin Birmingham Book Award in 1991.

The Author
Anne Fine has won numerous awards over the years including the Carnegie Medal and the British Book Awards both in 1990 and 1993.

Notes

External links
  Anne Fine Website

1988 British novels
British children's novels
Novels by Anne Fine
Hamish Hamilton books
1988 children's books